Doyles on the Beach is an Australian seafood restaurant founded in 1885. Located on Marine Parade in Watsons Bay, Sydney, it is Australia's oldest continually running fish and chip shop, currently owned by Michael Doyle. There is both an à la carte restaurant and a garden bar at the Marine Parade establishment. It has two sisters restaurants: Doyles Fishermans Wharf, also in Watsons Bay, and Doyles at the Sydney Fish Market.

In 2021, the restaurant was named in GQs list of the "18 most expensive restaurants in Australia".

One of the restaurant's attractions is the view over Sydney Harbour of the downtown Sydney skyline four miles to the east.

Gallery

See also

List of oldest companies in Australia
List of seafood restaurants

References

External links

Restaurants in Sydney
Buildings and structures in Sydney
Australian companies established in 1885
Restaurants established in 1885
Seafood restaurants
Watsons Bay, New South Wales
Fish and chip restaurants